Tamás Róbert Sárpátki (born December 28, 1994) is a Hungarian professional ice hockey Forward who currently plays for Fehérvár AV19 in the Austrian Hockey League (EBEL).

References

External links

1994 births
Fehérvár AV19 players
Living people
Hungarian ice hockey forwards
Sportspeople from Miercurea Ciuc